Jackman Thomas Harlow (born March 13, 1998) is an American rapper, singer, songwriter, and actor from Louisville, Kentucky. He started his career in 2015 and released several EPs and mixtapes before he was signed to Don Cannon and DJ Drama's record label Generation Now in 2018, an imprint of Atlantic Records.

Harlow's first major breakthrough came with the release of his 2020 single, "Whats Poppin." Aided by its popularity on TikTok, and following a remix with rappers DaBaby, Tory Lanez, and Lil Wayne, it peaked at number two on the US Billboard Hot 100 and went on to receive a Grammy Award nomination. Harlow was included on XXL magazine's "2020 Freshman Class" before he released his debut studio album, Thats What They All Say (2020), which was certified platinum in the US. In 2021, Harlow released a collaboration with Lil Nas X, "Industry Baby," which reached number one on the Hot 100, becoming Harlow's first chart-topper. Harlow released his second album Come Home the Kids Miss You in 2022, and its single, "First Class," became his second number one on the Hot 100 and first to debut atop the chart.

Harlow has received several award nominations from various institutions, including Top New Artist at the 2021 Billboard Music Awards. In the same year, he was named Variety’s "Hitmaker of the Year" and was included in Forbes 30 Under 30. In 2022, it was announced that Harlow will make his acting debut in a remake of the 1992 film White Men Can't Jump directed by Calmatic.

Early life 
Jackman Thomas Harlow was born on March 13, 1998, in Louisville, Kentucky. He is the son of Maggie (née Payette), a businesswoman, and Brian Harlow, and was raised on a horse farm near Shelbyville. He has one younger brother, Clayborn Harlow. He is of French, Jewish, and Irish descent.

Harlow moved from Shelbyville to Louisville with his family as a child and began rapping at age 12. He and his friend Copelan Garvey used a Guitar Hero microphone and a laptop to record rhymes and songs. They made a CD, Rippin' and Rappin, and sold copies at their school, Highland Middle School. When he was in seventh grade, Harlow acquired a professional microphone and made his first mixtape, Extra Credit, using the moniker Mr. Harlow. He formed a collective, Moose Gang, with various friends; during this time, he worked on two mixtapes that were ultimately never released, Moose Gang and Music for the Deaf. He attended Atherton High School, where he played on the boys' varsity soccer team.

Career

2015–2018: Early mixtapes and Private Garden
In November 2015, Harlow released his first commercial record, the EP The Handsome Harlow. It was released on Gill Holland's sonaBLAST! record label. Throughout high school, he often played sold-out shows at Louisville venues like Mercury Ballroom, Headliners, and the Haymarket Whiskey Bar. In March 2016, he opened for Vince Staples in Louisville.

In June 2016, less than a month after graduating from Atherton High School, he released the mixtape 18, which was the first album on his label and music collective, Private Garden. The collective also features Harlow's frequent collaborators, the Homies, composed of Louisville rappers and producers Ace Pro, 2forWoyne, Shloob, Quiiso, and Ronnie Lucciano. Over the course of the next year, Harlow performed at South by Southwest, Bonnaroo Music Festival, and the Forecastle Festival.

In the summer of 2017, Harlow released the single "Routine". In October of that year, he released another single, "Dark Knight", with an accompanying music video. He credits Cyhi the Prynce with helping him work through his writer's block and finish the song. "Dark Knight" became the lead single on Harlow's mixtape Gazebo, which was released in November 2017. Harlow went on a 14-city Gazebo Tour in support of the album. The Homies opened for Harlow, and the tour ended in January 2018. In May 2018, Harlow opened for indie rock band Portugal. The Man on select tour dates. The next month, he was featured alongside Lil James and Sixteen on the Skeme song "Get Sumn".

2018–2020: Generation Now Records, Loose, and Confetti

After moving to Atlanta, Harlow worked at the Chick-fil-A in the Georgia State University cafeteria to supplement his income. A month after working at the cafeteria he was introduced to DJ Drama at Mean Street Studio.

In August 2018, it was announced that Harlow had signed to DJ Drama and Don Cannon's Generation Now record label, in conjunction with Atlantic Records. He also released a video for his single "Sundown" on the day of the announcement. On August 17, Harlow released his major label debut mixtape, Loose. The album featured guest verses from CyHi the Prynce, K Camp, 2forWoyne, and Taylor. In November 2018, Harlow embarked on a North American tour in support of Loose which ended in December. That month, he also released a video for the song "PickYourPhoneUp", featuring K Camp. Loose was nominated for Best Mixtape at the 2019 BET Hip Hop Awards. On August 21, 2019, Harlow released the single "Thru the Night" featuring fellow Louisville native Bryson Tiller. He then released the 12-track mixtape Confetti, which features Tiller, 2forWoyne and EST Gee.

2020–2021: Thats What They All Say
On January 21, 2020, Harlow released the single "Whats Poppin", as the lead single from his second extended play (EP), Sweet Action. The song was widely shared on the TikTok social media platform, and the Cole Bennett-produced video has surpassed 135 million views as of May 2021. On Harlow's 22nd birthday, March 13, 2020, he released the EP. On April 29, 2020, Harlow released a collaboration with G-Eazy, "Moana". On June 24, 2020, Harlow released the remix of "Whats Poppin", which features DaBaby, Tory Lanez, and Lil Wayne. The remix propelled the song to reach number two on the Hot 100. On August 11, Harlow was included in XXLs 2020 Freshman Class. On October 22, 2020, Harlow released the single "Tyler Herro", the lead single from his debut studio album, That's What They All Say. The song received a music video that stars Harlow and the NBA player of the same name. The song was praised for the "easy, weightless charisma" of Harlow's lyrics and delivery. On December 2, 2020, Harlow announced the album. The second single, "Way Out", which features Big Sean, was released on December 9, 2020. The album was released on December 11, 2020. It also includes "Whats Poppin" and its remix. On March 27, 2021, Harlow appeared as the musical guest on the 46th season of Saturday Night Live. He performed a medley of "Tyler Herro" and "Whats Poppin" for his first set and performed "Same Guy" with Adam Levine for his second set. He also appeared and performed a verse in the pre-recorded NFT-themed parody of Eminem's 2002 single, "Without Me". On March 30, 2021, "Already Best Friends", which features Chris Brown, was sent to urban contemporary radio as the third and final single from That's What They All Say.

On May 28, 2021, Harlow released a collaboration with Eminem and Cordae for the remix of Eminem's 2020 single, "Killer". On July 23, 2021, he released a collaboration with Lil Nas X, "Industry Baby". The song reached number one on the Hot 100, giving Harlow his first number-one single on the chart. On August 3, 2021, he released a collaboration with Pooh Shiesty, "SUVs (Black on Black)".

2022–present: Come Home the Kids Miss You
On February 18, 2022, Harlow released the single "Nail Tech", the lead single from his upcoming second studio album and his first release in six-and-a-half months. The song performed well on the Hot 100 with a number 18 debut and peak and also received praise from Kanye West, who previously was involved in the production of "Industry Baby". On February 24, Harlow was featured in West's song "Louie Bags" on his album, Donda 2.

On March 16, 2022, Harlow announced that his second studio album is titled Come Home the Kids Miss You. The album was released on May 6. It debuted at number three on the US Billboard 200, earning 113,000 album-equivalent units (including 8,000 in pure album sales) in its first week. It became Harlow's second US top-five debut on the chart. The album also accumulated a total of 137.05 million on-demand official streams for the album's songs. The album also peaked at number 4 on the UK Albums Chart, Harlow's highest debut and first top ten entry. The second single, "First Class", became his second number-one on the Billboard Hot 100, and the year's first hip-hop song to reach that position.

On September 3, 2022, Harlow performed at the 2022 college football season opener of the No. 2 Ohio State Buckeyes, which was a 21–10 win against the No. 5 Notre Dame Fighting Irish.

Acting debut
In March 2022, it was announced that Harlow will make his acting debut in a reboot of the 1992 film White Men Can't Jump directed by Calmatic.

In October 2022, Harlow appeared on Saturday Night Live as both host and musical guest for the Halloween episode.

Artistry

Style 
Harlow's craft has been characterized by critics as blending playful confidence with emotional sincerity in both his music and lyrics, which often explore themes such as sexuality, partying, and drug use. Harlow's music has been categorized broadly as hip hop. Publications have further tagged his music as blending trap beats with instruments such as pianos and uilleann pipes.

In 2020, Kate Hutchinson of The Guardian opined that Harlow's most interesting songs are his more introspective ones, dealing with topics such as being uncomfortable with his acclaim, and his white privilege. Thomas Hobbs, another writer for The Guardian, wrote that Harlow embraces "being a dorky outsider", while additionally having "enough charisma" to pull off "using language that is usually cringeworthy coming from suburban white people". He has described his own music as emphasizing rhythm, and his lyricism as being "personal but fun", and geared toward "connect[ing] with people". In 2022, following Harlow's surge in popularity, Terry Nguyen of Vox also described his music as breezy, comparing it to Drake. Nguyen praised Harlow's lyricism for its wise wordplay and for its introspective content.

Influences 
Harlow cites a range of influences across multiple genres, including Eminem, Drake, Kanye West, Lil Wayne, Outkast, Paul Wall, Willie Nelson, Johnny Cash, Hall & Oates, Fergie, and Jesse McCartney, among others. Harlow has also identified cinema as an influence, aiming for his songs to be "like short films". His favorite filmmakers are Martin Scorsese, Quentin Tarantino, and Alfred Hitchcock.

Philanthropy and activism
Harlow supports the Black Lives Matter political movement, having attended a rally to protest the killing of Breonna Taylor, which occurred in his hometown. Harlow has stated that, being white, he "can never truly know what [the experience of racism] is like", and that it is his responsibility as a white rapper to approach his work with that knowledge in mind.

In October 2021, Harlow donated to five Louisville-based organizations: AMPED, the Center for Women and Families, the Grace M. James Academy of Excellence, Louisville Urban League and Metro United Way. Citing the spirit and pride he holds for his hometown, Harlow stated that "People need hope, they need love", when announcing his donation plans. KFC and Instagram pledged to match up to $50,000 of what Harlow raises through the social media platform's fundraising tool.

In December 2021, Harlow teamed up with KFC and its parent company Yum! Brands to donate a joint $250,000 to the American Red Cross to support those impacted by a deadly tornado in the western region of Kentucky

Personal life 
In December 2022, it was reported that Harlow is dating Dua Lipa.

Discography 

 Thats What They All Say (2020)
 Come Home the Kids Miss You (2022)

Filmography

Tours 
Headlining tours
 Créme de la Créme Tour (2021)
 Come Home The Kids Miss You Tour (2022)

Awards and nominations

References 

1998 births
Living people
21st-century American rappers
American male rappers
American male songwriters
American people of French descent
American people of Irish descent
Atherton High School alumni
Atlantic Records artists
Musicians from Louisville, Kentucky
People from Shelbyville, Kentucky
Rappers from Kentucky
Songwriters from Kentucky
Record producers from Kentucky
Southern hip hop musicians
Pop rappers